The 1958 North Dakota Fighting Sioux football team, also known as the Nodaks, was an American football team that represented the University of North Dakota in the North Central Conference (NCC) during the 1958 NCAA College Division football season. In its second year under head coach Marvin C. Helling, the team compiled a 5–3 record (5–1 against NCC opponents), finished in sixth place out of seven teams in the NCC, and outscored opponents by a total of 157 to 85. The team played its home games at Memorial Stadium in Grand Forks, North Dakota.

Schedule

References

North Dakota
North Dakota Fighting Hawks football seasons
North Central Conference football champion seasons
North Dakota Fighting Sioux football